Virginia Sapiro (born February 28, 1951) is an American political scientist and political psychologist.

A native of East Orange, New Jersey, Sapiro graduated from Clark University in 1972, and obtained her doctorate from the University of Michigan in 1976, after which she began teaching at University of Wisconsin–Madison. She was appointed Sophonisba P. Breckinridge Professor of Political Science and Women's Studies there in 1995, and served through 2007, when she joined the Boston University faculty. Sapiro has served the American Political Science Association as secretary, vice president, and president of the APSA Organized Section on Women and Politics Research and as well as the APSA Organized Section on Elections, Public Opinion, and Voting Behavior.

References

1951 births
Living people
American women political scientists
American political scientists
Political psychologists
University of Michigan alumni
Clark University alumni
University of Wisconsin–Madison faculty
Boston University faculty
Writers from East Orange, New Jersey
21st-century American women writers
20th-century American women writers
20th-century American non-fiction writers
21st-century American non-fiction writers
American women academics